Luay Abdul-Ilah (born 1949) is an Iraqi writer and translator. He was born in Baghdad and studied mathematics in Baghdad University. He has published several short story collections and a novel titled Divine Names (translated into English by Judy Cumberbatch). Living in London since 1985, he has worked for Al-Sharq Al-Awsat, SOAS and the University of Westminster.

References

Iraqi writers
1949 births
Living people